WBZL is a Country formatted broadcast radio station.  The station is licensed to Greenwood, Mississippi and serves Greenwood, Grenada, Indianola, and Winona in Mississippi.  WBZL is owned and operated by Telesouth Communications Inc.

References

External links
 103.3 The Possum on Facebook
 

2010 establishments in Mississippi
Classic country radio stations in the United States
Radio stations established in 2010
BZL